This is a list of masters of Downing College, Cambridge. The head of Downing College, Cambridge is termed the "Master". Downing was founded as a result of the will of Sir George Downing, 3rd Baronet and it received its Royal Charter in 1800 from George III.

The current Master is Alan Bookbinder, a former journalist.

List of Masters

References

 

Downing College, Cambridge
 
Downing